Chenalu (also Romanized as Chenālū) is a village in Eslamabad Rural District, in the Central District of Zarand County, Kerman Province, Iran. At the 2006 census, its population was 14, in 4 families.

References 

Populated places in Zarand County